Guy Bernaert (17 May 1940 in Antwerp – 15 March 2017 in Borgerhout) was a Belgian television writer.
He has written Belgian TV series such as Alfa Papa Tango in 1990 which he co-wrote with Mark De Bie.

TV Filmography
Windkracht 10 (1997) TV Series (writer)
Oog in oog (1991) TV Series (writer)
Alfa Papa Tango (1990) TV Series (writer)
Kapersbrief, De (1989)
Begeren, Het (1988) (TV)
Langs de kade (1988) TV Series (writer)
Liegebeest, Het (1983) TV Series (writer)

External links
 

Flemish television writers
Male television writers
2017 deaths
1940 births
Belgian male writers